Lifetime Thing is the sixteenth studio album by American soul musician Isaac Hayes. The album was released in 1981, by Polydor Records.

Track listing
All tracks composed by Isaac Hayes; except where indicated

References

1981 albums
Isaac Hayes albums
albums produced by Isaac Hayes
Polydor Records albums